Skal vi danse? returned for a sixth season on September 11, 2010 – November 20, 2010. This time the dance was on Saturdays. The judges are the same from season 5. All of the dancers trained in both Cha-Cha-Cha and English Waltz for several weeks.

Couples

Scoring Chart

Red numbers indicate the lowest score for each week.
Green numbers indicate the highest score for each week.
 indicates the couple eliminated that week.
 The couple are in the bottom two that week.
 indicates the winning couple.
 indicates the runner-up couple.
 indicates the third-place couple.
 indicates the couple withdrew.
 indicates the couple was eliminated but brought back due to a withdrawal.

Highest and lowest scoring performances of the series 
The best and worst performances in each dance according to the judges' marks are as follows:

Averages

Dance schedule
The celebrities and professional partners danced one of these routines for each corresponding week.
 Week 1: Waltz or Cha-Cha-Cha
 Week 2: Pasodoble or Quickstep
 Week 3: Tango or Rumba
 Week 4: Jive
 Week 5: One unlearned dance
 Week 6: Samba or Slowfox
 Week 7: One unlearned dance
 Week 8: One unlearned dance & Team Cha-Cha-Cha
 Week 9: Showdance
 Week 10: One unlearned dance & Jive
 Week 11: One unlearned dance, one repeated dance
 Week 12: One ballroom dance, one Latin dance & Showdance

Songs
The songs they are going to dance in Skal vi danse? for each week.

Week 1
Individual judges scores in the chart below (given in parentheses) are listed in this order from left to right: Trine Dehli Cleve, Tor Fløysvik, Karianne Gulliksen, Christer Tornell.

Week 2

Week 3

Week 4

Week 5

Week 6

Week 7

Week 8

Week 9

Week 10

Week 11

Week 12

Call-out Order
The table below lists the order in which the contestants' fates were revealed. The order of the safe couples doesn't reflect the viewer voting results.

 This couple came in first place with the judges.
 This couple came in last place with the judges.
 This couple came in last place with the judges and was eliminated.
 This couple was eliminated.
 This couple was not eliminated.
 This couple would have been eliminated but was not eliminated due to other couple's withdrawal.
 This couple won the competition.
 This couple came in second in the competition.

Dances performed

 Highest scoring dance
 Lowest scoring dance

Call-out order
The table below lists the order in which the contestants'fates were revealed. The order of the safe couples does not reflect the viewer voting results.

See also
Skal vi danse?
Skal vi danse? (season 4)
Skal vi danse? (season 5)
Dancing with the Stars International Versions

References

External links

2010 Norwegian television seasons
Skal vi danse?